This is a discography for the American rock band Primus. For individual songs, see the category listing.

Studio albums

Live albums

Extended plays

Compilation albums

Video albums

Singles

Music videos
Primus hired many of their friends from the Bay Area to be in the stage crew, and many of them appear in Primus's videos and home videos.

Compilations and soundtracks
1988 - Germ's Choice: A KUSF Compilation (promo for KUSF radio, featuring the demo version of "Tommy the Cat")
1991 - A Different Sound (promo for Carlsberg Light lager, featuring "Tommy the Cat")
1992 - Plan B: the questionable video features Here come the bastards, Tommy the cat.  
1991 - Bill & Ted's Bogus Journey (soundtrack, featuring "Tommy the Cat")
1991 - Expand-O: CD Tune Up 12 (featuring "Jerry Was a Race Car Driver")
1993 - The Beavis and Butt-head Experience (soundtrack, featuring the original track "Poetry and Prose")
1993 - In Defense of Animals (benefit compilation album, featuring "Too Many Puppies")
1993 - Lollapalooza '93 (sampler, featuring studio version of "Mr. Krinkle")
1994 - Airheads (soundtrack, featuring the original track "Bastardizing Jellikit")
1994 - Brainscan (soundtrack, featuring "Welcome to This World")
1994 - Caroline Records 1994 Sampler (promo for Caroline Records, featuring "John the Fisherman")
1994 - Woodstock 1994 (live album, featuring "Those Damned Blue Collar Tweekers")
1995 - Obdurate (promo for HM magazine, featuring a live version of "Here Come the Bastards")
1995 - Phuq! (featuring "Wynona's Big Brown Beaver")
1996 - Bored Generation (featuring "Hellbound 17½")
1996 - Eyesore: A Stab at The Residents (The Residents tribute album, featuring the Primus cover of "Hello Skinny/Constantinople")
1996 - Music for Our Mother Ocean, Vol. 1 (promo for the Surfrider Foundation, featuring a live version of "Mr. Knowitall")
1996 - X Games Volume 1: Music from the Edge (promo for ESPN's X Games, featuring "Jerry Was a Race Car Driver")
1997 - Crossing All Over!: Volume 6 (featuring "Shake Hands with Beef")
1997 - Rock Sound: Volume 10 (promo for Rock Sound magazine, featuring "Shake Hands with Beef")
1997 - Universal Attaque!: Vol. 1 (featuring "Shake Hands with Beef")
1997 - Zoo Magazine: CD Sampler 10 (promo for Zoo magazine, featuring "My Name is Mud")
1998 - Chef Aid: The South Park Album (soundtrack, featuring the original tracks "South Park Theme" and "Mephisto and Kevin")
1998 - Indie 2000: Volume 3 (featuring "Shake Hands with Beef")
1998 - Interscope Sampler: Volume One (promo for Interscope Records, featuring the Primus cover of Stanley Clarke's "Silly Putty")
1998 - The New, the Classic & the Unexplored: Volume Three (promo for Visions magazine, featuring "To Defy the Laws of Tradition")
1998 - Pinkpop 1998 Sampler (featuring a live version of "Bob's Party Time Lounge")
1998 - Tijdloze Honderd: Vol 4 (featuring "Too Many Puppies")
1999 - Celebrity Deathmatch (soundtrack, featuring the studio version of "The Heckler")
1999 - Family Values Tour 1999 (live album, featuring "Lacquer Head" and "My Name is Mud")
1999 - Jack Kerouac Reads On the Road (Jack Kerouac compilation, featuring a cover of "On the Road" recorded by Tom Waits and Primus)
1999 - The New, the Classic & the Unexplored: Volume Nine (promo for Visions magazine, featuring "South Park Theme")
1999 - Opscene: CD#11 (featuring "Mama Didn't Raise No Fool")
1999 - Take Off 2000: Loud Music for the Next Millenium (featuring "Lacquer Head")
1999 - Visions 75th Anniversary Compilation: Part II (promo for Visions magazine, featuring the Primus cover of Pink Floyd's "Have a Cigar")
2000 - Big Noize (featuring "Electric Uncle Sam")
2000 - Nativity in Black II (Black Sabbath tribute album featuring a cover of "N.I.B." recorded by Primus and Ozzy Osbourne)
2003 - Triple J's Hottest 100 10th Anniversary: Hottest Box (promo for Triple J radio's Hottest 100, featuring "Wynona's Big Brown Beaver")
2004 - Alternative Rock Edition (featuring "Too Many Puppies")
2004 - Bonnaroo Music Festival 2004 (live album, featuring "Frizzle Fry")
2005 - Prince of Darkness (Ozzy Osbourne box set, featuring the cover of "N.I.B." recorded by Primus and Osbourne)
2005 - Triple J's Super Request: Dog's Breakfast (promo for Triple J radio's Super Request, featuring "Electric Uncle Sam")
2006 - Orphans: Brawlers, Bawlers & Bastards (Tom Waits compilation, featuring the cover of "On the Road" recorded by Primus and Waits)
2008 - Zack and Miri Make a Porno (soundtrack, featuring "Wynona's Big Brown Beaver")

Video compilations
2004 - Live from Bonnaroo Music Festival 2004 (DVD)

Television show theme songs
1997-2000 - South Park: seasons 1-4 ("South Park Theme", released on Chef Aid, 1998)
2000-2006 - South Park: seasons 4-10 (various remixes of "South Park Theme", unreleased)
2006-present - South Park: seasons 10-14 (mashup of "South Park Theme" and "Whamola" by Les Claypool's Frog Brigade, unreleased)

Video game soundtracks
1995 - Beavis and Butt-head in Virtual Stupidity (featuring "DMV")
1999 - Hot Wheels Turbo Racing (featuring "Hamster Style")
1999 - Tony Hawk's Pro Skater (featuring "Jerry Was a Race Car Driver")
2000 - Vampire: The Masquerade – Redemption (featuring "Electric Uncle Sam")
2001 - ATV Offroad Fury (featuring "Jerry Was a Race Car Driver")
2006 - Guitar Hero 2 (featuring "John the Fisherman")
2006 - Tony Hawk's Project 8 (featuring "American Life")
2010 - Rock Band 3 (featuring "Jerry Was a Race Car Driver")
2014 - Rocksmith (featuring "Jerry Was a Race Car Driver, "Tommy the Cat", "Wynona's Big Brown Beaver", "South Park Theme")

See also
Riddles Are Abound Tonight - album by the 1988 Primus lineup under the name Sausage.
Lance "Link" Montoya - the original cover sculptor for Suck On This, Frizzle Fry, Sailing the Seas of Cheese, Pork Soda, and Animals Should Not Try to Act Like People.

References

Discographies
Discographies of American artists
Rock music group discographies